In financial technical analysis, a candlestick pattern is a movement in prices shown graphically on a candlestick chart that some believe can predict a particular market movement. The recognition of the pattern is subjective and programs that are used for charting have to rely on predefined rules to match the pattern. There are 42 recognized patterns that can be split into simple and complex patterns.

History 
Some of the earliest technical trading analysis was used to track prices of rice in the 18th century.  Much of the credit for candlestick charting goes to Munehisa Homma (1724–1803), a rice merchant from Sakata, Japan who traded in the Ojima Rice market in Osaka during the Tokugawa Shogunate. According to Steve Nison, however, candlestick charting came later, probably beginning after 1850.

Formation of candlestick 

Candlesticks are graphical representations of price movements for a given period of time. They are commonly formed by the opening, high, low, and closing prices of a financial instrument.

If the opening price is above the closing price then a filled (normally red or black) candlestick is drawn.

If the closing price is above the opening price, then normally a green or hollow candlestick (white with black outline) is shown.

The filled or hollow portion of the candle is known as the body or real body, and can be long, normal, or short depending on its proportion to the lines above or below it.

The lines above and below, known as shadows, tails, or wicks, represent the high and low price ranges within a specified time period. However, not all candlesticks have shadows.

Simple patterns

Complex patterns

See also
 The Island Reversal

Further reading

References

External links
  Bulkowski's Stock Market Patterns  On line, includes research, statistical validation, and follow-on results..

Candlestick patterns
Technical analysis